Mischief in Wonderland is a 1957 West German fantasy film directed by Otto Meyer, loosely based on the story Schlaraffenland by poet Hans Sachs and a satire on the German Wirtschaftswunder. The film was released in the United States by K. Gordon Murray. It is also known as Riot in Cockaigne and Scandal in Fairyland.

Plot 
The king of Irgendwo is beset by worries: The food stocks are empty and he has no money. The only way out, proposed by his advisers Schnorr and Astropolex, to marry off his young daughter to the Sultan of Persipanien, fails: The princess denied the marriage and the sultan wants a rich wife.

One night during a thunderstorm, a young woman arrives at the castle. The king lets her in and gives her the last milk ration. She turns out to be a fairy who now wants to thank him: He receives a magic button with which he can ask for any food he wants. Soon the inhabitants of the little kingdom are living in a wonderland. From the village fountain now gushes wine and lemonade, the fountain itself is made of marzipan and the fences are made of chocolate. To avoid jeopardizing the splendor, a rice pudding mountain is built around the kingdom.

But soon people, especially children, realize there are disadvantages. All the people are fat and the school is closed due to "laziness". They ask the princess for help, as she is the only person who has avoided eating too much. But the adults got used to the new way of life, so a riot breaks out in the land of milk and honey ...

Cast 
 Alexander Engel as the King of Irgendwo
 Werner Krüger as the Scholar Astropolex
 Sabine Sesselmann as the Fairy
 Cordula Trantow as the Princess
 Alexa von Porembsky as the Chambermaid
 Harry Wüstenhagen as the Valet Schnorr
 Otto Czarski as the Physician
 Helmut Ziegner as the Sultan of Persipanien

See also
 Cockaigne

References

External links 
 

1957 films
1950s children's fantasy films
West German films
Films based on fairy tales
German children's fantasy films
Films set in a fictional country
1950s German films